Lucie Bílá  (born April 7, 1966 as Hana Zaňáková) is a Czech pop singer. According to her label, EMI Czech Republic, the singer has sold over one million albums.  She won  the Czech musical award,  Český slavík 13 times, the highest number.

Biography
Lucie Bílá (born Hana Zaňáková) was born in the town of Otvovice in Czechoslovakia to Czech mother and Slovak father, where she was raised and where she attended a secondary school.  Before she became involved in the field of music, she trained to be a seamstress.

Bila's first experiences with show business were as a member of the rock bands Rock-Automat and Arakain. In 1980, she was noticed by Czech music producer Petr Hannig, who created her stage name Lucie Bílá (literally, Lucy White) and penned her first recorded songs. Her name change was originally due to confusion with another famous Czech singer, Hana Zagorová.  For over three decades, Bílá has had tremendous professional success among Czechs in a broad range of endeavors, starring in the best-known stage musicals in the country, releasing several popular solo albums, and starring in several films and television specials.  For several years in a row in the 2000s she topped the list of the most popular Czech singers in the coveted Český slavík awards.

Her personal relationships have been rocky and are perennial tabloid fodder. She and her boyfriend Petr Kratochvíl had a son, Filip, born in 1995. Not long after, he left her for beauty queen finalist Pavlína Babůrkova. In 2002, she was married briefly to musician Stanislav Penk, and in 2006 she married another musician, Václav "Noid" Bárta. The pair divorced in 2008. Her name Hana means "grace" in Hebrew.

Discography

Studio albums
 1986: Lucie Bílá (I)
 1992: Missariel
 1994: Lucie Bílá (II)
 1997: Duety with Karel Gott
 1998: Hvězdy jako hvězdy
 1999: Úplně nahá
 2003: Jampadampa
 2007: Woman
 2009: Bang! Bang!
 2010: Bíle Vánoce
 2012: Modi
 2014: Recitál
 2014: Diamond Collection
 2016: HANA
 2017: Bílé Vánoce Lucie Bílé II.
 2018: Duety with Karel Gott
 2019: Ta o mně

Musicals
 1992: Bídníci
 1993: Zahrada rajských potěšení
 1995: Dracula (225,000 units sold)
 1996: Krysař
 2000: Johanka z Arku (DVD release charted at No. 14 on the Czech Video Chart in 2009)
 2003: Romeo a Julie
 2003: Excalibur
 2005: Elixír života
 2005: Láska je láska
 2008: Němcová!
 2008: Carmen
 2012: Aida
 2014: The Addams Family

Awards

Major awards

Notes
 A  The award in the category of the Best Video won director Filip Renč for "Láska je láska".
 B  "Zahrada rajských potěšení" directed by Filip Renč won the award in the Best Video category.
 C  The video of Bílá's "Ave Maria" directed by František Antonín Brabec won the Best Video category.
 D  According to the results published by Mladá fronta DNES, Bílá finished as the third receiving 16% votes from academics in 2000. While the winner Lenka Dusilová earned 51%, the second nominee Helena Vondráčková scored 33% votes.
 E  Although, the initially published list with featuring five nominees in total included also Bílá, two days later the Akademie populární hudby announced the final list limited to three artists per category. Bílá was not selected, eventually.

Polls

Notes
 F  Both editions, in 2005 and 2006 won Aneta Langerová.
 G  In 1996, 1999 and 2001 Bílá was also classified as the second winner of the poll overall.
 H  As the absolute winner Bílá would be ranked in the 97' edition and in 1998.
 I  In 2000, Bílá finished as the third winner of the poll total.
 J  In 2021, won Ewa Farná.

See also
 The 100 Greatest Slovak Albums of All Time

References

General
 
 
 
 
Specific

External links

 
 EMImusic.cz
 

 Lucie Bílá at ''Billboard'
 Lucie Bílá on Discogs
 Lucie Bílá at the Internet Movie Database

1966 births
Living people
21st-century Czech women singers
Czech-language singers
Czech stage actresses
Czech musical theatre actresses
Czech people of Slovak descent
People from Kladno District
20th-century Czech women singers
Recipients of the Thalia Award